The Northern Light is the student newspaper at the University of Alaska Anchorage. The Northern Light began in September 1988, after the University of Alaska Anchorage and Anchorage Community College merged. The paper is completely produced by students.

The Northern Light has a circulation of 5,000 copies a week during school semesters, making it the third largest weekly in Anchorage. It is financed by student fees and advertising. Every Tuesday, The Northern Light is delivered to stands around campus and Anchorage. It is also mailed to businesses and politicians in Alaska, as well as any public member who requests a copy.
The paper consists of five sections: News, Features, Opinion, Arts & Entertainment, and Sports.

The Northern Light is an affiliate of UWIRE, which distributes and promotes its content to their network. It has also been a member of the Associated Press since 1988.

The current executive editor is Levi Brown. The current managing editor is Cheyenne Mathews.

Awards
Since 1993, the staff has won state and national awards for its content, design, photography and website, including over 40 Alaska Press Club awards

The Associated Collegiate Press Pacemaker in 2011 and 2009 in the non-daily, four year category for general excellence. The Northern Light was also nominated for a Pacemaker in 2000 and 2007
The website www.thenorthernlight.org was an Associated Collegiate Press Online Pacemaker finalist in 2012.
3rd in ACP Best of Show, 2011.
 2nd best weekly newspaper in Alaska by the Alaska Press Club, 2005.
 Best Website (All media) in Alaska by the Alaska Press Club, 2019.

Staff
The Northern Lights staff consists of college students of all majors and backgrounds. All open positions are listed on UAkJobs.

Executive editor
Managing editor
Advertising manager
Copy editor
Layout editor
News editor
Assistant news editor
Features editor
Assistant features editor
Arts & entertainment editor
Assistant arts & entertainment editor
Sports editor
Assistant sports editor
Photo editor
Web editor
Multimedia editor
Graphic designer
Advertising representative
Staff reporters
Staff photographers

Past editors

Executive editors
Caleigh Jensen (2019–present)
Levi Brown (2018–2019)
Sam Davenport (2016–2018)
Kelly Ireland (2014–2016)
Ashley Snyder (2013–14)
 J. Almendarez (2012–13)
 Shana Roberson (2011)
Jerzy Shedlock (2011)
Josh Edge (2010)
Suzanna Caldwell (2009)
Gretchen Weiss (2008–09)

Managing editors
Samantha Davenport (2016)
Kierra Hammons (2015)
Tulsi Patil (2014)
Ashley Snyder (2013)
 J. Almendarez (2012)
Taylor Hall (2011)
Matt Caprioli (2011)
Jerzy Shedlock (2010)

Volunteering
Anyone with a willingness to do a little work and stay on top of deadlines is encouraged to apply as a volunteer. The requirements for volunteering are as follows:

Be enrolled at UAA with no less than 3 credits per semester.
Be in good academic and disciplinary standing with UAA.
Have a cumulative GPA of at least 2.0 or higher.

Volunteer positions include:
Story writers
Columnists
Photographers
Graphic designers
Cartoonists

References

External links
 Official site

1988 establishments in Alaska
Mass media in Anchorage, Alaska
Publications established in 1988
Student newspapers published in Alaska
University of Alaska Anchorage